Gjøstein is a Norwegian surname. Notable people with the surname include:

Johan Gjøstein (1866–1935), Norwegian educator, newspaper editor and politician
Klaus Gjøstein (1905–1992), Norwegian painter

See also
Ingerid Gjøstein Resi
Kjell Gjøstein Aabrek

Norwegian-language surnames